Kurstin is a surname. Notable people with the surname include:

Greg Kurstin (born 1969), American songwriter and record producer
Pamelia Kurstin (born 1976), American musician

See also
Kerstin